Ganokh,  locally called Ganishah, is a village in the Kharmang District of Baltistan, Pakistan, close to the Line of Control with Indian-administered Ladakh. It is populated by about 400 Brokpas professing Shia Islam.

Geography 
The village of Ganokh consists of two census settlements, Gambat Ganokh and Goma Ganokh. Both lie in the valley of the Ganokh Nala, a tributary of the Indus River. The Line of Control (LOC) with Indian-administered Kashmir (Ladakh) run south of the valley, about  along the Indus, on a ridge line that forms the watershed between the Ganokh Nala and the Ghargurdo and Yaldor Nalas on the other. It continues on to the Chorbat La pass.

Demographics 
Ganokh is populated by about 400 Brokpas professing Shia Islam. According to a 2022 news report, it is the only village in Pakistan where the Brokskat language is spoken.

History 
Historically, Ganokh and the adjacent regions were populated by Brokpa people. Folklore maintains that they arrived there from the Gilgit region through the Gavis valley (to the north of the Ganokh valley) and colonised Ganokh, Yaldor, and Hanu before spreading to Dha. Their chieftains wielded significant autonomy in the region, pledging nominal allegiance to the Maqpon rulers of Skardu.

However, things changed in the seventeenth century when Jamyang Namgyal of Ladakh faced a conflict with Ali Sher Khan Anchan of Skardu and had to accept Gurgurdho as a boundary between their territories. Consequently, Ganokh was integrated into Baltistan and became influenced by Shia Islam. Nevertheless, the local Brokpas continued to maintain marital relations with their ethnic kin in the Dah Hanu region of Ladakh; cross-border trade also occurred, with the village serving as a tax collection post. 

Family connections ceased when the latter accepted Buddhism in c. late nineteenth century. In the aftermath of the First Kashmir War (1947–1948), Ganokh fell in Pakistan and became permanently inaccessible for Dah-Hanu Brokpas. During the 1999 Kargil War, the Ganokh valley provided a key infiltration route for Pakistani forces, through which they accessed the valleys of the Indian Brokpa area. The ensuing shelling and fighting caused much loss of life and property in Ganokh village. Many had to be evacuated and remain internally displaced even two decades after the war.

Notes

References

Bibliography 
 
 
 
 
Populated places in Kharmang District